Tilabad (also Romanized as Tīlābād) is a village in Cheshmeh Saran Rural District, Cheshmeh Saran District, Azadshahr County, Golestan Province, Iran. At the 2006 census, its population was 585, in 142 families.

References 

Populated places in Azadshahr County